Bernardino de Campos is a municipality in the state of São Paulo in Brazil. The population is 11,158 (2020 est.) in an area of 244.2 km2.

History

Bernardino de Campos became a municipality on 9 October 1923 by State Law No. 1929, introduced on 22 December of the same year.  Until 1886 it was a small village called Douradão, then it took the name of Figueira, and subsequently it was renamed as Peace district, and, finally, Bernardino José de Campos Júnior, in honor of the governor of the State of São Paulo of that time.  With the arrival of the Sorocabana railroad in 1907, gradually it developed its economy, which is based on agriculture, especially coffee, cotton, sugarcane, maize, and soya beans plantations, and also agribusiness, and dairy and beef cattles.

Bernardino de Campos Anthem
The municipal anthem, with lyrics written by Peter Jamil Sawaya and music composed by Antenor Ferreira de Godoy, was approved by the city council on the bill discussed on 7 December 1970.

Geography
Its population was 11,777 inhabitants in 2010 census.

References

Municipalities in São Paulo (state)
1923 establishments in Brazil